George Weber may refer to:

 George Weber (radio personality) (1961–2009), American radio personality
 George D. Weber (1925–2012), American politician from Missouri
 George Heinrich Weber (1752–1828), German botanist

See also 
 Georg Weber (disambiguation)
 George Webber (disambiguation)